Elaphandra retroflexa is a species of flowering plant in the family Asteraceae. It is found only in Ecuador. Its natural habitat is subtropical or tropical dry forests. It is threatened by habitat loss.

References

retroflexa
Flora of Ecuador
Critically endangered plants
Taxonomy articles created by Polbot